Makani Christensen was a 2016 Democratic Party candidate for the U.S. Senate seat in Hawaii. He was defeated in the primary race by Brian Schatz. He was the chair of the Oahu Aha Moku Advisory Committee, of which advises the state of Hawaii. He is a combat veteran of both Iraq and Afghanistan, and a graduate of the United States Naval Academy.

Activism
Makani is also known for his organization of the volunteer efforts to continue a search for twelve Marines who died in a helicopter collision in January 2016.  As executive director of the Hunting, Farming and Fishing Association, he participated in protests against the temporary closure of fishing along 3.6 miles of reef at Kaupulehu Bay. He is well known in the fishing world, helping to preserve the public right to access the ocean, as opposed to many bill proposed. He is also a member of the Maunalua Bay Recreation Advisory Committee appointed by DNLR.

References 

American nonprofit chief executives
Hawaii Democrats
Living people
Year of birth missing (living people)